Édgar Everaldo Valencia Bobadilla (born 31 March 1971) is a retired Guatemalan football midfielder who spent his career playing for several clubs in Guatemala's top division and was also a member of the Guatemala national team.

Club career
Nicknamed el Negro, Valencia started his professional career at Galcasa, then in 1993 he joined Municipal, and later had a lengthy spell at their eternal rivals Comunicaciones. In January 2008, he joined his brother Pedro at then second division side Deportivo Amatitlán, postponing his retirement.

International career
He made his debut for Guatemala in 1991 and earned a total of 57 caps, scoring 5 goals and representing his country in 13 FIFA World Cup qualification matches and playing in several UNCAF Cup tournaments as well as at the 1998, 2000 and 2003 CONCACAF Gold Cups. His final international was an August 2003 friendly match against Ecuador.

References

External links

1971 births
Living people
Guatemalan footballers
Guatemala international footballers
1991 CONCACAF Gold Cup players
1996 CONCACAF Gold Cup players
1998 CONCACAF Gold Cup players
2000 CONCACAF Gold Cup players
2003 CONCACAF Gold Cup players
C.S.D. Municipal players
Comunicaciones F.C. players
C.D. Suchitepéquez players
Antigua GFC players

Association football midfielders
C.S.D. Galcasa players